Dariush Eghbali, known mononymously as Dariush, is an Iranian singer.

Biography

Childhood and Youth 
Dariush was born in Tehran to parents from Mianeh on 4 February 1951. He spent his early years in Mianeh, Karaj and his musical talent was first recognized at age nine when he appeared on stage at his school. Hassan Khayatbashi introduced him to the public at age 20 through Iranian national television. He gained popularity for his song "Don't Tell Me You Love Me". (Persian: به من نگو دوست دارم )

Before the Islamic Revolution 
Before the Islamic Revolution in Iran, Dariush was named the most popular singer in Iran by a youth magazine in 1977. Dariush also worked with many famous pre-revolution songwriters in Iran.

Imprisonment 
During the rule of Shah Mohammadreza Pahlavi, Darisuh was arrested and sentenced to prison many several times because he sang political songs. Such songs include Jangal, Bonbast, and Booye Gandom. During his first sentence, Parvis Sabeti said that after an officer of the crown arrested him, he was kept in solitary confinement for 6 months. He was then released after a total of 9 months in prison. In total, he was in prison for 26 months during the Mohammadreza Pahlavi era.

After the Islamic Revolution 
After the Islamic Revolution, Dariush left Iran in 1978 and became a part of the diasporic music scene in Los Angeles. His work consists of over 208 songs in over 27 albums. He has also performed in two Iranian movies. Dariush's song "Dastaye To (Your Hands)" was named as the most enduring song in Iranian music history by Manoto TV. Ethnomusicology Professor Farzaneh Hemmasi has described Dariush as "the best-loved popular musician of his generation" alongside Googoosh. His new songs protested Iran's new political system, which caused his popularity to grow even more, making him one of the most well known Iranian singers. Also, while staying in Los Angeles, he supported all Iranians who sought asylum.

Addiction 
Dariush suffered through a heroin addiction ever since his first imprisonment. In the year 2000 Dariush quit heroin, and sang a song titled Silent Miracle (Persian: معجزه خاموش). The song references a turning point in his life, where he is through with being addicted. Dariush launched his recovery site, https://www.ayeneh.org/, (ayeneh translates to mirror in Persian) which marked history as the first ever website to help Iranian addicts and their families. Then, he started his Ayeneh foundation (mirror foundation in Persian) to help Iranian addicts. His foundation has helped 40,000 Iranians quit addiction so far.

Philanthropy 

The Ayeneh (Mirror) Foundation was established by Dariush aimed at helping addicts recover. The Ayeneh foundation broadcasts radio and television programs to help addicts and their families. They also set up various seminars to help families.

Dariush is a member of Amnesty International. Dariush helps Amnesty International by focusing efforts on Iranian asylum seekers, as well as saving working children.

Personal life 
He is married to Venus Eghbali.

See also 
 Shahyar Ghanbari
 Leila Kasra
 Mina Assadi
 Farid Zoland
 Ebi
 Iraj Janati Ataei
 Googoosh

References

External links 

Official Site

1951 births
Living people
Iranian exiles
Iranian bloggers
Iranian activists
People from Tehran
People from Mianeh
Acid attack victims
Iranian pop singers
Singers from Tehran
Iranian male singers
Iranian rock singers
Iranian Azerbaijanis
Iranian Shia Muslims
Musicians from Tehran
Caltex Records artists
Taraneh Records artists
Persian-language singers
Iranian singer-songwriters
Azerbaijani-language singers
Iranian prisoners and detainees
Prisoners and detainees of Iran
20th-century Iranian male singers
American people of Azerbaijani descent